Gilman Lake is a lake located north of Gilmantown, New York. Fish species present in the lake are sunfish and rainbow trout. There is a carry down off CR-16 on the east shore.

References

Lakes of New York (state)
Lakes of Hamilton County, New York